Baddeck, And That Sort of Thing is a travel journal written by Charles Dudley Warner, the American author who co-wrote The Gilded Age: A Tale of Today with Mark Twain.

In 1873, Joseph Twichell invited Warner to accompany him on a trip to Baddeck, Nova Scotia. Warner subsequently wrote an account of this trip, which became Baddeck, And That Sort of Thing. The book helped launch Baddeck, and Cape Breton more broadly, as a tourist destination and may have influenced Alexander Graham Bell's decision to build a home in Baddeck. While Warner's story may have has a positive impact on Cape Breton's economy, the story angered many Cape Bretoners for its portrayal of them as simple and backward.

References

External links
 Baddeck, And That Sort of Thing on Project Gutenberg 

Books about Nova Scotia
American travel books
Victoria County, Nova Scotia
1874 books
1870s in Canada